New Light is an unincorporated community in Richland Parish, Louisiana, United States.

Name origin
In 1982 during an interview with Lula and Leo Cheek it was speculated that the name of the community is symbolic and that it has a biblical connotations.

References

Unincorporated communities in Richland Parish, Louisiana
Unincorporated communities in Louisiana